Sers may refer to:

 Sers, Armenia
 Sers, Charente, France 
 Sers, Hautes-Pyrénées, France
 Sers, Tunisia

SERS may refer to:

 Surface enhanced Raman spectroscopy (SERS)
 Selective En bloc Redevelopment Scheme, a housing strategy in Singapore
Pennsylvania State Employees' Retirement System (SERS), a public pension system